Slick Willie or Slick Willy may refer to:

Willie Brown (politician), former California legislator and San Francisco mayor
Bill Clinton, former president of the United States
W. W. Herenton, former mayor of Memphis
Willie Sutton, a prolific bank robber
Willy Wise, boxer
William Nylander, NHL forward